Kosava, also known as Kossovo (formerly is a small city in the Ivatsevichy District in the Brest Region of Belarus, located at . 

The nearby village of Merechevschina is the birthplace of Tadeusz Kościuszko. Kosava is the birthplace of Rabbi Avraham Yeshayahu Karelitz. Nearby is the ruined Kosava Castle, built by the Pusłowski family in 1830, and a replica of Tadeusz Kościuszko's house in Mereczowszczyzna.

History

The first settlements at this place are known since X-XI centuries as the land of Kievan Rus. First written record was fixed in 1494, when this land was a part of Polish–Lithuanian Commonwealth. After 1795, it became a part of Russian Empire. Since 1915 till 1918, the town was under German occupation, was occupied by Poland after Polish–Soviet War. On 3 February 1927, as Polish newspaper Robotnik reported, polish policemen shot manifestation of peasants that claimed to release imprisoned deputies.

External links 
Photos on Radzima.org
Webpage about Kosava Castle

 
Ivatsevichy District
Nowogródek Voivodeship (1507–1795)
Slonimsky Uyezd
Polesie Voivodeship
Populated places in Brest Region
Towns in Belarus